9–10th & Locust station is an underground rapid transit station on the PATCO Speedline, operated by the Delaware River Port Authority. It is located in the Washington Square West neighborhood of Center City, Philadelphia, under Locust Street between 9th and 10th Streets, after which the station is named.

This station is one of two that do not have 24-hour service, closing daily between 12:15 am and 4:15 am.

Notable places nearby 
The station is within walking distance of the following notable places:
 Jefferson Hospital for Neuroscience
 Thomas Jefferson University Hospital
 Pennsylvania Hospital
 Walnut Street Theatre
 Wills Eye Hospital

References

External links 
9th-10th & Locust (PATCO)

PATCO Speedline stations in Philadelphia
Railway stations in Philadelphia
Railway stations in the United States opened in 1953
Railway stations located underground in Pennsylvania